Redruth South is an electoral division of Cornwall in the United Kingdom and returns one member to sit on Cornwall Council. The current Councillor is Ian Thomas, an Independent.

Redruth South (styled as Redruth (South) until 1985) was also an electoral division returned one member to Cornwall County Council between 1973 and the abolition of the council in 2009. Kerrier District Council also had a division called Redruth South which returned three members between 1979 and the abolition of the council in 2009.

Extent
The current Cornwall Council division covers the south of Redruth as well as the hamlet of Church Town. Parts of Carn Brea Village are also included (the village being covered mostly by Four Lanes division).

Councillors

Cornwall Council

Cornwall County Council

Kerrier District Council

Election results

Cornwall Council division

2017 election

2013 election

2009 election

Cornwall County Council division

2005 election

2001 election

1997 election

1993 election

1989 election

1985 election

1981 election

1977 election

1973 election

References

Electoral divisions of Cornwall Council
Redruth
Electoral divisions of Cornwall County Council